Michael Jones (1944 – March 14, 2018) was a Canadian film director and screenwriter based in Newfoundland. He is known for his films which depicted the island's culture and humour.

Early life
Jones was born on March 28, 1944, the son of Agnes Dobbin and Michael Jones Sr. He was a brother to satirical Newfoundland writers/actors Andy Jones and Cathy Jones. Jones attended St. Bonaventure’s College, graduating in 1962. He joined the Christian Brothers and studied at New York's Catholic Iona College.  He earned a master's degree at Notre Dame.

Career
Jones took a position as a teacher in St. John’s, Newfoundland, where he became involved in filmmaking. He left the Brothers in 1969. He left teaching to train with the National Film Board of Canada’s Atlantic Studio in 1974, and was a founding member of the Newfoundland Independent Filmmaker’s Co-op in 1975. Along with his brother Andy he created the film The Adventure of Faustus Bidgood, which was filmed over a period of ten years. He also directed Secret Nation and Congratulations. He was nominated for two Genie Awards for Faustus Bidgood, including Best Original Screenplay and Best Editing.

Mike Jones performed minor roles in all of his films, including the French teacher in Faustus Bidgood. He provided the voice of Leo Cryptus in his film Secret Nation, a sequel to Faustus, and played the lead role in William D. MacGillivray's 1983 film Stations. Although he was not a performing member of CODCO - the long-lived comedy troupe which included siblings Andy and Cathy - Jones directed and edited  the company's short films including "Dolly Cake", "Sisters of the Silver Scalpel" and "Ship Inn Man".

Death
Jones died March 14, 2018, at the Health Sciences Centre in St. John's, Newfoundland.

References

External links

1944 births
2018 deaths
20th-century Canadian screenwriters
Film directors from Newfoundland and Labrador
Canadian film editors
Canadian television directors
Canadian theatre directors
Canadian male film actors
Writers from St. John's, Newfoundland and Labrador
Male actors from Newfoundland and Labrador
20th-century Canadian male actors
21st-century Canadian screenwriters
Canadian male screenwriters
Film producers from Newfoundland and Labrador